Zheleznik is a village in Chernoochene Municipality, Kardzhali Province, southern Bulgaria.

All inhabitants are ethnic  Turks.

References

Villages in Kardzhali Province